Club Balonmano Granollers, commonly known as BM Granollers, is a handball club based in Granollers, Spain.

History

The club was founded in 1944 and it is one of the oldest and most successful Spanish handball clubs in terms of titles won. Since its inception, the club quickly got a great competitive level. BM Granollers has competed almost every season in the top league of Spanish handball (currently Liga ASOBAL). It became the first Spanish handball club taking part in a European competition in 1959. BM Granollers won the EHF Cup Winners' Cup in 1976, so it became the first Spanish handball club winning a European title.

Thanks to this history, the city of Granollers hosted the handball matches at the Barcelona 1992 Olympic Games. The Palau d'Esports, the current club's arena, was built for this event and subsequently has also hosted the 2013 World Men's Handball Championship and the 2021 World Women's Handball Championship.

One of the BM Granollers' landmarks is its commitment with young players formation. Many great handball players and team managers have been formed in BM Granollers youth academy (players such as Joan Cañellas, Antonio García, Enric Masip and Mateo Garralda; team managers such as Pep Vilà, Miquel Roca Mas, Sead Hasanefendić, Toni García and Carlos Viver). In recent years, moreover, BM Granollers has significantly increased the number of female teams in the youth academy. From the 2014–15 season, BM Granollers has become the only handball club in Spain with main male and female teams simultaneously in the top league of Spanish handball (Liga ASOBAL and División de Honor Femenina).

Men's handball team

Crest, colours, supporters

Kit manufacturers

Kits

Sports Hall information

Name: – Palau d'Esports
City: – Granollers
Capacity: – 5685
Address: – Carrer de Francesc Macià i Llussà, s/n, 08400 Granollers, Catalonia, Spain

Team

Current squad
Squad for the 2022–23 season

Technical staff
 Head coach:  Antonio Rama
 Assistant coach:  Pablo Larrumbide
 Goalkeeping coach:  Perico García
 Physiotherapist:  Ivan García Perez
 Club Doctor:  Dr. Joan Vives

Transfers
Transfers for the 2022–23 season

Joining 
  Yusuf Faruk (RB) from  Vive Kielce
  Guilherme Torriani (LW) from  Handebol Clube Taubaté
  David Roca Rodríguez (RB) from  Balonmano Sinfín

Leaving 
  Chema Márquez (CB) to  Saint-Raphaël VHB
  Alejandro Márquez Coloma (RB) to  Istres Provence Handball

Previous squads

Honours

Domestic and European competitions
 1 EHF Cup Winner's Cup: 1975–76
 2 EHF Cup: 1994–95, 1995–96
 10 Spanish leagues: 1958–59, 1959–60, 1960–61, 1965–66, 1966–67, 1967–68, 1969–70, 1970–71, 1971–72, 1973–74
 3 Copa del Rey: 1957–58, 1969–70, 1973–74
 1 ASOBAL Cup: 1993–94
 4 Catalan leagues: 1985–86, 1988–89, 1989–90, 1990–91
 1 Pyrenées league: 2008

 Double
 Winners (2): 1969–70, 1973–74

Season to season
BM Granollers has been playing the top Spanish handball league since 1955, except on 1963–64 and 1964–65 seasons, when it resigned due to changes in the competition system and economic reasons.

European record

Cup Winners' Cup
From the 2012–13 season, the men's competition was merged with the EHF Cup.

EHF Cup and EHF European League

EHF ranking

Former club members

Notable former players

  Vicente Álamo (2002–2008)
  Marc Amargant (1996–2003)
  Juan Andreu (2004–2010)
  Álvaro Cabanas (2016–2018)
  Raúl Campos (2001–2012)
  José Luis Pérez Canca (2003–2008)
  Joan Cañellas (2004–2005, 2008–2009)
  Marc Cañellas (2014–2018)
  Juan del Arco (2009–2015)
  Aitor Etxaburu (1991–1993)
  Eduard Fernández Roura (1997–2002)
  Álvaro Ferrer (2001–2011, 2015–2019)
  Adrià Figueras (2014–2020)
  Jaume Fort (1981–1990)
  Aleix Franch (1987–1992)
  Arnau García (2011–2017)
  Mateo Garralda (1986–1991)
  Cristian Malmagro (2000–2007)
  Chema Márquez (2020–2022)
  Enric Masip (1987–1990)
  Jordi Nuñez (1986–1995)
  Gonzalo Pérez de Vargas (2011–2013)
  Jaime Puig (1976–1989)
  Salvador Puig (1993–2003, 2008–2011, 2014–2016)
  Antonio García Robledo (2003–2011, 2018–2019, 2020–)
  Albert Rocas (1997–2000)
  Álvaro Ruiz Sánchez (2013–2015)
  Eugeni Serrano (1977–1979)
  Ferran Solé (2011–2016)
  Ian Tarrafeta (2017–2020)
  Antonio Ugalde (1994–2003)
  Pol Valera (2017–)
  Carlos Viver (1991–1999, 2000–2008)
  Nicolás Bonanno (2019–2020)
  Matías Schulz (2013–2014)
  Denis Bahtijarević (2001–2004)
  César Almeida (2015–2016, 2017–2020)
  Oswaldo Guimarães (2018–2020)
  Rangel Luan (2021–)
  Fernando Pacheco Filho (2015–2016)
  Henrique Teixeira (2015–2016)
  José Toledo (2014–2015)
  Guilherme Torriani (2022–)
  Guilherme Valadão Gama (2014–2016)
  Esteban Salinas (2020–)
  Rodrigo Salinas Muñoz (2012–2014)
  Patrik Ćavar (2001–2005)
  Venio Losert (2001–2004)
  Zoran Mikulić (1995–1996)
  Michal Kasal (2016–2017)
  Tomáš Řezníček (2011–2012)
  Éric Cailleaux (1983–1984)
  Árni Þór Sigtryggsson (2007–2008)
  Geir Sveinsson (1989–1991)
  Kim Sung-Heon (1999–2001)
  Rolandas Bernatonis (2017–2018)
  Aidenas Malašinskas (2011–2013)
  Veselin Vujović (1993–1995)
  Vyacheslav Atavin (2000–2002)
  Vladislav Kalarash (1996–1997)
  Oleg Kisselev (1992–1994)
  Andrey Tyumentsev (1991–1992)
  Goran Kozomara (2001–2002)
  Igor Butulija (1994–1995)
  Davor Čutura (2007–2010)
  Marko Krivokapić (2004–2007)
  Draško Nenadić (2010–2012, 2019–2020)
  Ivan Nikčević (2010–2011)
  Dimitrije Pejanović (2014–2015)
  Aleksandar Svitlica (2007–2011)
  Slobodan Veselinović (1997–1999)
  Michael Apelgren (2009–2010)
  Per Carlén (1985–1989)
  Peter Gentzel (2000–2001)
  Nicklas Grundsten (2009–2015)
  Peder Järphag (1986–1988)
  Fredrik Ohlander (2008–2011)
  Tomas Sivertsson (2000–2001)
  Ljubomir Vranjes (1999–2001)

Former coaches

Women's handball team

Honours

Domestic competition

 7 Catalan Champions Trophy: 2014, 2015, 2016, 2017, 2018, 2019, 2020
 1 Spanish Championship (División de Honor Plata): 2013–14

Season to season

BM Granollers has been playing the top Spanish handball league since 2014.

Team

Current squad

Squad for the 2020–21 season

Technical staff:

  Robert Cuesta | Head coach
  Jessica Bonilla | Assistant manager
  Antonio Romero | Team liaison
  Joan Vives Turcó | Doctor

References

External links
  
 

 
Catalan handball clubs
Liga ASOBAL teams
Handball clubs established in 1944